'Autumn Bough' is an early ripening cultivar of domesticated apple also known by various other names including 'Montgomery Sweet', 'Philadelphia Sweet', 'Sweet Bellflower', 'Sweet Harvest', and 'White Sugar'.

References

External links

Apple cultivars